Lars Kristian Ranthe (born 26 August 1969) is a Danish film and television actor.

Selected filmography

Selected television work

References

External links 

1969 births
Danish male film actors
Danish male television actors
Best Supporting Actor Bodil Award winners
Male actors from Copenhagen
Living people